Digi-Battle, also known as Digimon and Digital Monster Card Game / Hyper Coloseeum in some markets, is an out-of-print collectible card game (CCG) by Upper Deck and Bandai. It was initially released in February 2000 as fixed 62-card starter decks, they changed the card design at the end of 2000 but because Upper deck already printed a French version of the booster 3 series in the traditional style, they still went ahead and released it, Bandai went on to release four 30-card "Street Decks in the new design". Six additional expansions were released called Series 1 through 6. Upper Deck's contract with Bandai expired after the release of Series 2, when Bandai began producing it. Digi-Battle released a series of promos through Taco Bell as well as other venues like movie theaters, video game and television promotions. The game ended in 2001 with a transition to Bandai's next CCG iteration called Digimon D-Tector that was mostly released in stores like Walgreens.

References

Collectible card games
Card games introduced in 2000
Digimon